Dustin's Daily News (DDN) is a television chat/comedy show, broadcast on RTÉ Two. A predecessor of The Once a Week Show, it served as a new home for Dustin the Turkey, who had until then been part of The Den. Dustin co-presented with an assistant, Sinéad Ni Churnain. Two series were produced. The first series aired between 19 September 2005 and 29 April 2006, while the second series aired between September 2006 and April 2007.

Dustin's Daily News took place in the Dublin Mountains, where Dustin established his own network news channel. While Dustin would always be able to avoid being captured by a butcher in the opening sequence, he had another villain to contend with during the run of the show. The infamous Martin Duck planned a takeover of Dustin's news channel, but gardaí foiled him.

Episodes

Series one 
Episodes dating from January 2006 are available online.

January 2006

February 2006

March 2006

April 2006

Series two

September 2006

October 2006

November 2006

December 2006

January 2007

February 2007

March 2007

April 2007

DDN Reloaded
There were six DDN Reloaded special episodes.

References

External links
 Official website

2005 Irish television series debuts
2007 Irish television series endings
Irish children's television shows
Irish comedy television shows
Irish television news shows
Irish television shows featuring puppetry
RTÉ original programming